"Church" is a song by Australian electronic DJ and producer Alison Wonderland. It was released on 16 February 2018 as the second single from Wonderland's second studio album, Awake. The song peaked at number 54 in Australia. Remixes were released on 30 March 2018.

"Church" is about breaking out of a toxic relationship and realising your own self-worth. Wonderland told Triple J "But it was the first thing that came to my mind. I felt like shouting at that person "I wish you would treat me like church! Praise me, make me feel like I'm worth something"."

The accompanying video for "Church" was shot in Los Angeles and directed by Bo Mirosseni. It depicts an ethereal Wonderland and a young gospel choir against a church backdrop.

Reception
Kat Bein from Billboard said "Next time you need a pick me up, listen to Alison Wonderland's 'Church.'" saying "It's triumphant with a big, booming chorus and a beat that bounces happily in the face of anyone who wants to tear you down."

Track listing
One-track single
"Church" – 3:04

Remixes
"Church" (Naderi remix) – 3:30
"Church" (The Presets remix) – 4:24
"Church" (Ghost Choir remix) – 2:54
"Church" (Party Pupils remix) – 2:55
"Church" (Hex Cougar remix) – 3:29

Charts

Certifications

Release history

References

2017 songs
2018 singles
Alison Wonderland songs
Songs written by Joel Little